An observation deck, observation platform, or viewing platform is an elevated sightseeing platform usually situated upon a tall architectural structure, such as a skyscraper or observation tower. Observation decks are sometimes enclosed from weather, and a few may include coin-operated telescopes for viewing distant features.

List of public observation decks

List of highest observation decks by type

Timeline of world's highest observation decks
This is a timeline of the development of world's highest observation decks since the inauguration of the Washington Monument in 1885.

Under construction 

 Unknown Jeddah Tower, Jeddah, Saudi Arabia. 637 m, Level 157
Unknown Goldin Finance 117, Tianjin, China. 578.7 m, Level 116
 2023 (est.) Merdeka 118, Kuala Lumpur, Malaysia. 517.7 m , Level 117 (Spire observation level at 566 m)
 2027 (est) Taipei Twin Towers, Taipei, Taiwan. 347 m, Level 73

Approved

 2025 (est.) Signature Tower Jakarta, Jakarta, Indonesia. 515.8 m, Level 111
 2028 (est.) Torch Tower, Tokyo, Japan. 300 m, Level 55
 2030 (est.) Millennium Tower, Frankfurt, Germany. 280 m, Level 67

See also List of tallest buildings and structures in the world#World's highest observation deck

Observation deck gallery

See also
 Observation car
 Observation wheel

References

Buildings and structures by type
Architectural elements
Tourist attractions
Landscape